"Days" is a song by the Kinks, written by lead singer Ray Davies, released as a single in 1968. It also appeared on an early version of the album The Kinks Are the Village Green Preservation Society (released only in continental Europe and New Zealand).  It now appears as a bonus track of the remastered CD. On the original Pye 7N 17573 label, the name of the song is "Day's" due to a grammatical error.

Release and reception
The song was an important single for Davies and the Kinks, coming in a year of declining commercial fortunes for the band. The song had been intended as an album track but after the relative failure of the previous single "Wonderboy" (which only reached No. 36 in the UK), "Days" was rushed out as a single with an old unreleased track "She's Got Everything" (recorded in February 1966 in the same session as "Dedicated Follower of Fashion") as the B-side.  Billboard praised the single's "groovy rhythm" and "clever lyric." It reached No. 12 on the UK Singles Chart, but failed to chart in the U.S. This did not help future releases, as the next four Kinks singles failed to reach the top 30 (two of them failing to chart altogether) in the UK.

Personnel
According to band researcher Doug Hinman:

The Kinks
Ray Davies lead vocal, acoustic guitar
Dave Davies backing vocal, electric guitar
Pete Quaife bass guitar
Mick Avory drums

Additional musicians
Rasa Davies backing vocal
Nicky Hopkins piano, Mellotron

Kirsty MacColl version

Kirsty MacColl covered "Days" on her second studio album Kite (1989). It was released as the album's second single on 19 June 1989 and reached No. 12 on the UK Singles Chart, the same position achieved by the Kinks in 1968. In Ireland, MacColl's version charted seven places higher than the original, at No. 9. It was re-released in 1995, charting much lower, reaching only No. 42 in the UK. It is one of MacColl's most popular singles.

Background
"Days" was released as the second single from Kite, following "Free World". MacColl's label, Virgin, had intended to release "Days" as the lead single, but MacColl felt the first single from Kite had to be one which she wrote.

Recalling her version of "Days", MacColl told James Bennett in 1994: "I think my version is a bit slower [than the Kinks' original], I wanted to give it the ABBA treatment. I wanted people to think that it's a Kirsty MacColl song when they hear it."

Music video
The video features MacColl in old fashioned clothing sitting on a meadow and riding in a boat whilst encountering animated animals. The video, which features MacColl's friend and songwriting partner Pete Glenister on guitar, was directed by Simon West and produced by Kate Sylvester. It was shot in April 1989 at Godalming.

Critical reception
On its release, Music & Media wrote, "A tasteful, folky sing-along tune that many people will know by heart at the end of this summer." Tim Nicholson of Record Mirror considered the song to be "slower and more considered" than "Free World", but added that it "should be right on target [for] the charts." Jerry Smith, reviewer of British music newspaper Music Week, expressed an opinion that after the low performance in the charts of the previous single, the new song, especially the cover version, is unlikely to have any prospects. 

Barbara Ellen of New Musical Express commented, "'Days' isn't one of Kirsty's own but remains a good choice. An uneven ballad, it stares with wide and serious eyes at the more sentimental end of the charts." In a retrospective review of Kite, Stewart Mason of AllMusic described MacColl's version of "Days" as a "gorgeous cover" with "thick, lush harmonies".

Track listing
 "Days"
 "Happy"
 "El Paso"
 "Still Life"
 "Please Help Me, I'm Falling"
The single was released in multiple formats. Each featured "Days" and "Happy", and all bar the 7" and cassette featured "Still Life". Both CD formats (the standard case and the Kite-shaped case) had "Please Help Me, I'm Falling", whilst "El Paso" was only available on the 10".

Other versions

The song was covered by a number of artists at the time including Petula Clark on her 1968 album Petula, The Hillsiders as a B-side to their 1969 single "Kentucky Woman" (RCA 1804) and James Last in an instrumental version on Non-Stop Dancing No. 7 (also 1969).
 
"Days" / "This Time Tomorrow" – by Ray Davies and Mumford & Sons is featured on Ray Davies solo album, See My Friends.

The song was also covered by Flo & Eddie on the album Flo & Eddie, which was originally released in 1974 and was re-released in 2008 as a double CD with The Phlorescent Leech and Eddie, which was originally released in 1972.

Charts

Notes

References

Sources

 
 

The Kinks songs
Petula Clark songs
Kirsty MacColl songs
1968 singles
1989 singles
Songs written by Ray Davies
Song recordings produced by Ray Davies
Pye Records singles
Reprise Records singles
1968 songs
Song recordings produced by Steve Lillywhite